Robert More (1581–1626) was an English politician.

Robert More may also refer to:
Robert More (botanist) (1703–1780), British botanist, Mayor of Shrewsbury, 1727 and MP for Bishops Castle, 1727–41 and Shrewsbury, 1754–61
Robert More (MP for Dorset) (c. 1377–1422), MP for Dorset 1417
Robert More (died 1407), MP for Hampshire 1397
Robert More (Wisconsin), a 19th-century member of the Wisconsin State Assembly
Robert More (MP for Dartmouth), MP for Dartmouth 1386
Jasper More (Liberal politician) (Robert Jasper More, 1836–1903)

See also
Robert Moore (disambiguation)